"Wham Rap! (Enjoy What You Do)" is the debut single by English pop duo Wham! on Innervision Records, released in June 1982. It was written by Wham! members George Michael and Andrew Ridgeley.

History
Wham Rap! was the first song written by Michael and Ridgeley following the breakup of their previous band, The Executive, but before they had officially formed (or named) Wham! The genesis of the song began in 1981 and was a result of Ridgeley making up his own words ("Wham! Bam! I am the man!") while dancing to "Rapper's Delight" with Michael and Shirley in Bogart's nightclub in South Harrow. As they continued to work on the song an ultimatum to Michael from his father inspired the line "Get yourself a job or get out of this house". 
A demo of Wham Rap! was recorded by local music producer Paul Mex, in January 1982 along with Club Tropicana and Careless Whisper on Mex's TEAC 4-track Portastudio, with the resulting 3 song demo-tape gaining Wham! their record contract with Innervision Records some weeks later. Innervision quickly arranged for a proper demo of the song to be recorded at Halligan Band Centre in Holloway (on 24 March 1982) using session musicians on bass and drums, which was then used by Michael and Ridgeley as a backing track for promotional performances at various nightclubs in preparation for their debut release.

Synopsis
Although rap was still an underground and almost exclusively American phenomenon in the early 1980s, Michael rapped—as the title implies—a number of verses about the joys of living every day to the fullest, reveling in unemployment and celebrating government assistance from the Department of Health and Social Security (the initials "DHSS" are repeatedly chanted during the song). The explicitly political song flew in the face of the conventional British left-wing who were talking about the 'right to work' at the time. The chorus asked the question "Do you enjoy what you do?", which brought about the bracketed section of the title.

Music video
The music video was filmed in London in February 1983 after the single was re-issued. The video shows Michael and Ridgeley as two unemployed youths who were spending their time teaching one another on how to live their life while roaming about the streets of London. They wear leather jackets, combining their moody image with a bright, effervescent choreography. 

The two are joined by Shirlie Holliman and their band in front of a white background with red letters reading 'WHAM!'. It is here that the group practises dance routines accompanied by background dancers.

Chart performance
The song, which had been tentatively released in June 1982 when Wham! were unknown, failed to make any impact and was later re-issued in January 1983 after the duo had achieved their breakthrough with "Young Guns (Go for It!)". The single subsequently reached No. 8 on the UK Singles Chart, the second release of four hits from Wham!'s debut album Fantastic.

Versions
A remix of the song was made in 1986, combining some of the Unsocial Mix with the album version. This version, entitled "Wham! Rap '86", was released on their American and Japanese album Music from the Edge of Heaven, and as the B-side on the 7-inch single "The Edge of Heaven" in the UK, Australia and Europe.

Uncharacteristically for Wham!, the Unsocial Mix of the song contains multiple repetitions of the swear words "damn", "bullshit", "shit" and "crap". All versions include "don't need this crap". These lines were included to illustrate the band's then-rebellious image, and future songs by Wham! would mostly refrain from using this type of language (although "Battlestations" does include an instance of "bullshit"). Both the Social Mix and the Fantastic album version have different verses from the Unsocial Mix; thus, there are three different sets of verse lyrics altogether. However, only the album version has appeared on CD.

Track listing

1982 release

Note: Due to an error in labelling, the "Unsocial Mix" is listed as the single's A-side despite Michael specifically referring to it as the B-side in the song's lyrics: "Hey, everybody, now listen to me/Cut the radio bullshit, this is side B."

1983 reissue

Charts

Weekly charts

Year-end charts

References

1982 songs
1982 debut singles
1983 singles
Wham! songs
CBS Records singles
Innervision Records singles
Songs written by George Michael
Songs written by Andrew Ridgeley